Hotel Ritsa is a hotel in Sukhumi, Abkhazia, Georgia. The luxury hotel is located on the seacoast, along the Sukhumi quay, near the historical centre and is decorated with bas-reliefs. It was damaged during the war in early 1990s and restored in 2000s. It contains two restaurants; "San Remo" which serves European cuisine and "Aktafurta" which serves Abkhaz cuisine.

References

External links
Image

Hotels in Abkhazia
Sukhumi
Hotels established in 1914
Hotel buildings completed in 1914